Petromyscus is a genus of rodent in the family Nesomyidae. It is so distinct from other rodents that it is placed as the only genus in subfamily Petromyscinae. In previous classifications, Delanymys brooksi has also been placed in the subfamily. They are found in southwestern Africa. These animals have a sharp lower point to their V-shaped infraorbital canal.  Their molars are intermediate between the ancestral cricetid style tooth and the dendromurine style tooth.

The genus contains the following species:
 Barbour's rock mouse (Petromyscus barbouri)
 Pygmy rock mouse (Petromyscus collinus)
 Brukkaros pygmy rock mouse (Petromyscus monticularis)
 Shortridge's rock mouse (Petromyscus shortridgei)

References
Jansa, S. A., S. M. Goodman, and P. K. Tucker. 1999. Molecular phylogeny and biogeography of the native rodents of Madagascar (Muridae, Nesomyinae): a test of the single origin hypothesis. Cladistics, 15:253-270.
Jansa, S. A. and M. Weksler. Phylogeny of muroid rodents: relationships within and among major lineages as determined by IRBP gene sequences.  Molecular Phylogenetics and Evolution, 31:256-276.
Kingdon, J. 1997. The Kingdon Field Guide to African Mammals. Academic Press Limited, London.

Nowak, R. M. 1999. Walker's Mammals of the World, Vol. 2. Johns Hopkins University Press, London. 
Steppan, S. J., R. A. Adkins, and J. Anderson. 2004. Phylogeny and divergence date estimates of rapid radiations in muroid rodents based on multiple nuclear genes. Systematic Biology, 53:533-553.

 
Rodent genera
Taxa named by Oldfield Thomas
Taxonomy articles created by Polbot